John Hygdon (or Hygden) (1472–1533) was an English academic and churchman.

Career
President of Magdalen College, Oxford, from 1516 to 1525, Hygdon became the first dean of Cardinal College, Oxford (1525–31) and from 1532–3 of its successor, King Henry VIII's College (later refounded as Christ Church). From 1502–4, he had served as vicar of Upper Beeding, Sussex. Brian Hygdon, the Dean of York, was his brother.

References

1472 births
1533 deaths
16th-century English clergy
Deans of Christ Church, Oxford
Fellows of Christ Church, Oxford
Fellows of Magdalen College, Oxford
15th-century English educators
People from Upper Beeding